The 1996 Liège–Bastogne–Liège was the 82nd edition of the Liège–Bastogne–Liège cycle race and was held on 21 April 1996. The race started in Liège and finished in Ans. The race was won by Pascal Richard of the MG Maglificio team.

General classification

References

1996
1996 in Belgian sport
Liege-Bastogne-Liege
1996 in road cycling
April 1996 sports events in Europe